Lewis Johnston (19 July 1917 – 12 March 1993) was a New Zealand cricket umpire. He stood in one Test match, New Zealand vs. England, in 1963.

See also
 List of Test cricket umpires
 English cricket team in New Zealand in 1962–63

References

1917 births
1993 deaths
People from Christchurch
New Zealand Test cricket umpires